The 1981–82 All-Ireland Senior Club Football Championship was the 12th staging of the All-Ireland Senior Club Football Championship since its establishment by the Gaelic Athletic Association in 1970-71.

St. Finbarr's were the defending champions, however, they failed to qualify after being beaten by Nemo Rangers in the 1981 Cork County Championship.

On 16 May 1982, Nemo Rangers won the championship following a 6-11 to 1-08 defeat of Garrymore in the All-Ireland final at Cusack Park. It was their third championship title overall and their first title since 1979.

Results

Munster Senior Club Football Championship

First round

Semi-finals

Final

All-Ireland Senior Club Football Championship

Quarter-final

Semi-finals

Final

Championship statistics

Miscellaneous

 Raheens won the Leinster Club Championship for the first time in their history. They were also the first team from Kildare to win the provincial title.
 Garrymore won the Connacht Club Championship title for the first time in their history.

References

1981 in Gaelic football
1982 in Gaelic football